Gałki may refer to the following places:
Gałki, Łódź Voivodeship (central Poland)
Gałki, Gmina Gielniów in Masovian Voivodeship (east-central Poland)
Gałki, Gmina Rusinów in Masovian Voivodeship (east-central Poland)
Gałki, Sokołów County in Masovian Voivodeship (east-central Poland)
Gałki, Węgrów County in Masovian Voivodeship (east-central Poland)